The Convention Relating to the Status of Refugees, also known as the 1951 Refugee Convention or the Geneva Convention of 28 July 1951, is a United Nations multilateral treaty that defines who a refugee is and sets out the rights of individuals who are granted asylum and the responsibilities of nations that grant asylum. The Convention also sets out which people do not qualify as refugees, such as war criminals. The Convention also provides for some visa-free travel for holders of refugee travel documents issued under the convention.

The Refugee Convention builds on Article 14 of the 1948 Universal Declaration of Human Rights, which recognizes the right of persons to seek asylum from persecution in other countries. A refugee may enjoy rights and benefits in a state in addition to those provided for in the Convention.

The rights created by the Convention generally still stand today. Some have argued that the complex nature of 21st century refugee relationships calls for a new treaty that recognizes the evolving nature of the nation-state, economic migrants, population displacement, environmental migrants, and modern warfare. Nevertheless, ideas like the principle of non-refoulement (non-returning of refugees to dangerous countries) (Article 33) are still applied today, with the 1951 Convention being the source of such rights.

History
Prior to the 1951 document, there was agreed a Convention relating to the International Status of Refugees, of 28 October 1933, which dealt with administrative measures such as the issuance of Nansen certificates, refoulement, legal questions, labour conditions, industrial accidents, welfare and relief, education, fiscal regime and exemption from reciprocity, and provided for the creation of committees for refugees.

The Convention was approved at a special United Nations conference on 28 July 1951, and entered into force on 22 April 1954. It was initially limited to protecting European refugees from before 1 January 1951 (after World War II), but states could make a declaration that the provisions would apply to refugees from other places.

The 1967 Protocol removed the time limits and applied to refugees "without any geographic limitation" but declarations previously made by parties to the Convention on geographic scope were grandfathered.

Parties
As of 20 January 2020, there were 146 parties to the Convention, and 147 to the Protocol.  Madagascar and Saint Kitts and Nevis are parties only to the Convention, while Cape Verde, the United States of America and Venezuela are parties only to the Protocol. Since the US ratified the Protocol in 1968, it undertook a majority of the obligations spelled out in the original 1951 document (Articles 2-34), and Article 1 as amended in the Protocol, as "supreme Law of the Land".

Definition of refugee
Article 1 of the Convention defines a refugee as:

With the passage of time and the emergence of new refugee situations, the need was increasingly felt to make the provisions of the 1951 Convention applicable to such new refugees. As a result, a Protocol Relating to the Status of Refugees was prepared, and entered into force on 4 October 1967. The UNHCR is called upon to provide international protection to refugees falling within its competence. The Protocol defined refugee to mean any person within the 1951 Convention definition as if the words "As a result of events occurring before 1 January 1951 and ..." were omitted.

Several groups have built upon the 1951 Convention to create a more objective definition. While their terms differ from those of the 1951 Convention, the Convention has significantly shaped the new, more objective definitions. They include the 1969 Convention Governing the Specific Aspects of Refugee Problems in Africa by the Organisation of African Unity (since 2002 African Union) and the 1984 Cartagena Declaration, while nonbinding, also sets out regional standards for refugees in South and Central Americas, Mexico and the Caribbean.

Scholars have started to consider this definition unsuitable for contemporary society, where for example environmental refugees are not captured in the definition.

Rights and responsibilities of parties
In the general principle of international law, treaties in force are binding upon the parties to it and must be performed in good faith. Countries that have ratified the Refugee Convention are obliged to protect refugees that are on their territory in accordance with its terms. There are a number of provisions to which parties to the Refugee Convention must adhere.

Refugees shall
 abide by the national laws of the contracting states (Article 2)

The contracting states shall
 exempt refugees from reciprocity (Article 7): That means that the granting of a right to a refugee should not be subject to the granting of similar treatment by the refugee's country of nationality, because refugees do not enjoy the protection of their home state.
 be able to take provisional measures against a refugee if needed in the interest of essential national security (Article 9)
 respect a refugee's personal status and the rights that come with it, particularly rights related to marriage (Article 12)
 provide free access to courts for refugees (Article 16)
 provide administrative assistance for refugees (Article 25)
 provide identity papers for refugees (Article 27)
 provide travel documents for refugees (Article 28)
 allow refugees to transfer their assets (Article 30)
 provide the possibility of assimilation and naturalization to refugees (Article 34)
 cooperate with the UNHCR (Article 35) in the exercise of its functions and help the UNHCR to supervise the implementation of the provisions in the Convention.
 provide information on any national legislation they may adopt to ensure the application of the Convention (Article 36).
 settle disputes they may have with other contracting states at the International Court of Justice if not otherwise possible (Article 38)

The contracting states shall not
 discriminate against refugees (Article 3)
 take exceptional measures against a refugee solely on account of his or her nationality (Article 8)
 expect refugees to pay taxes and fiscal charges that are different from those of nationals (Article 29)
 impose penalties on refugees who entered illegally in search of asylum if they present themselves without delay (Article 31), which is commonly interpreted to mean that their unlawful entry and presence ought not to be prosecuted at all
 expel refugees (Article 32)
 forcibly return or "refoul" refugees to the country they have fled from (Article 33). It is widely accepted that the prohibition of forcible return is part of customary international law. This means that even states that are not party to the 1951 Refugee Convention must respect the principle of non-refoulement. Therefore, states are obligated under the Convention and under customary international law to respect the principle of non-refoulement. If this principle is threatened, UNHCR can respond by intervening with relevant authorities and, if it deems necessary, will inform the public.

Refugees shall be treated at least like nationals in relation to
 freedom to practice their religion (Article 4)
 the respect and protection of artistic rights and industrial property (Article 14)
 rationing (Article 20)
 elementary education (Article 22)
 public relief and assistance (Article 23)
 labour legislation and social security (Article 24)

Refugees shall be treated at least like other non-nationals in relation to
 movable and immovable property (Article 13)
 the right of association in unions or other associations (Article  15)
 wage-earning employment (Article 17)
 self-employment (Article 18)
 practice of the liberal professions (Article 19)
 housing (Article 21)
 education higher than elementary  (Article 22)
 the right to free movement and free choice of residence within the country (Article 26)

Noncompliance

There is no body that monitors compliance. The United Nations High Commissioner for Refugees (UNHCR) has supervisory responsibilities but cannot enforce the Convention, and there is no formal mechanism for individuals to file complaints. The Convention specifies that complaints should be referred to the International Court of Justice. It appears that no nation has ever done this.

An individual may lodge a complaint with the UN Human Rights Committee under the International Covenant on Civil and Political Rights or with the UN Committee on Economic, Social and Cultural Rights under the International Covenant on Economic, Social and Cultural Rights, but no one has ever done so in regard to violations of the Convention. Nations may levy international sanctions against violators, but no nation has ever done so.

At present, the only real consequences of violation are 1) public shaming in the press, and 2) verbal condemnation of the violator by the UN and by other nations. To date, those have not proven to be significant deterrents.

See also
Asylum seeker
Asylum shopping
Convention relating to the Status of Stateless Persons
Impediment to expulsion
Office of the United Nations High Commissioner for Human Rights (OHCHR)
Refugee employment
Refugee law
Right of asylum
Statelessness
Travel document
Universal Declaration of Human Rights (Article 14)
United Nations Commission on Human Rights
World Refugee Day
XXB Refugee, as per the 1951 Convention Relating to the Status of Refugees

References 

 (HCR/1P/4/ENG/REV. 3)

External links

 Full text of the Convention (UNHCR)
 Introductory note by Guy S. Goodwin-Gill, procedural history note and audiovisual material on the Convention relating to the Status of Refugees and the Protocol relating to the Status of Refugees in the Historic Archives of the United Nations Audiovisual Library of International Law
 Lectures by Guy S. Goodwin-Gill entitled International Migration Law  – A General Introduction and Forced Migration – The Evolution of International Refugee Law and Organization in the Lecture Series of the United Nations Audiovisual Library of International Law

Convention
Human rights instruments
United Nations treaties
Treaties concluded in 1951
Treaties entered into force in 1954
Treaties of Afghanistan
Treaties of Albania
Treaties of Algeria
Treaties of the People's Republic of Angola
Treaties of Antigua and Barbuda
Treaties of Argentina
Treaties of Armenia
Treaties of Australia
Treaties of Austria
Treaties of Azerbaijan
Treaties of the Bahamas
Treaties of Belarus
Treaties of Belgium
Treaties of Belize
Treaties of the Republic of Dahomey
Treaties of Bolivia
Treaties of Bosnia and Herzegovina
Treaties of Botswana
Treaties of the Second Brazilian Republic
Treaties of Bulgaria
Treaties of Burkina Faso
Treaties of Burundi
Treaties of the State of Cambodia
Treaties of Cameroon
Treaties of Canada
Treaties of the Central African Republic
Treaties of Chad
Treaties of Chile
Treaties of the People's Republic of China
Treaties of Colombia
Treaties of the Republic of the Congo
Treaties of Costa Rica
Treaties of Ivory Coast
Treaties of Croatia
Treaties of Cyprus
Treaties of Czechoslovakia
Treaties of the Czech Republic
Treaties of the Democratic Republic of the Congo (1964–1971)
Treaties of Denmark
Treaties of Djibouti
Treaties of Dominica
Treaties of the Dominican Republic
Treaties of Ecuador
Treaties of Egypt
Treaties of El Salvador
Treaties of Equatorial Guinea
Treaties of Estonia
Treaties of the Ethiopian Empire
Treaties of Fiji
Treaties of Finland
Treaties of the French Fourth Republic
Treaties of Gabon
Treaties of the Gambia
Treaties of Georgia (country)
Treaties of West Germany
Treaties of East Germany
Treaties of Ghana
Treaties of the Kingdom of Greece
Treaties of Guatemala
Treaties of Guinea
Treaties of Guinea-Bissau
Treaties of Haiti
Treaties of the Holy See
Treaties of Honduras
Treaties of the Hungarian People's Republic
Treaties of Iceland
Treaties of Pahlavi Iran
Treaties of Ireland
Treaties of Israel
Treaties of Italy
Treaties of Jamaica
Treaties of Japan
Treaties of Kazakhstan
Treaties of Kenya
Treaties of Kyrgyzstan
Treaties of Latvia
Treaties of Lesotho
Treaties of Liberia
Treaties of Liechtenstein
Treaties of Lithuania
Treaties of Luxembourg
Treaties of Madagascar
Treaties of Malawi
Treaties of Mali
Treaties of Malta
Treaties of Mauritania
Treaties of Mexico
Treaties of Monaco
Treaties of Montenegro
Treaties of Morocco
Treaties of the People's Republic of Mozambique
Treaties of Namibia
Treaties of Nauru
Treaties of the Netherlands
Treaties of New Zealand
Treaties of Nicaragua
Treaties of Niger
Treaties of Nigeria
Treaties of Norway
Treaties of Panama
Treaties of Papua New Guinea
Treaties of Paraguay
Treaties of Peru
Treaties of the Philippines
Treaties of Poland
Treaties of the Estado Novo (Portugal)
Treaties of South Korea
Treaties of Moldova
Treaties of Romania
Treaties of Russia
Treaties of Rwanda
Treaties of Samoa
Treaties of São Tomé and Príncipe
Treaties of Senegal
Treaties of Serbia and Montenegro
Treaties of Yugoslavia
Treaties of Seychelles
Treaties of Sierra Leone
Treaties of Slovakia
Treaties of Slovenia
Treaties of the Solomon Islands
Treaties of the Somali Democratic Republic
Treaties of South Africa
Treaties of Spain
Treaties of Saint Kitts and Nevis
Treaties of Saint Vincent and the Grenadines
Treaties of the Democratic Republic of the Sudan
Treaties of Suriname
Treaties of Eswatini
Treaties of Sweden
Treaties of Switzerland
Treaties of Tajikistan
Treaties of North Macedonia
Treaties of East Timor
Treaties of Togo
Treaties of Trinidad and Tobago
Treaties of Tunisia
Treaties of Turkey
Treaties of Turkmenistan
Treaties of Tuvalu
Treaties of Uganda
Treaties of Ukraine
Treaties of the United Kingdom
Treaties of Tanzania
Treaties of Uruguay
Treaties of the Yemen Arab Republic
Treaties of Zambia
Treaties of Zimbabwe
1951 in Switzerland
Treaties extended to Greenland
Treaties extended to the Falkland Islands
Treaties extended to Saint Helena, Ascension and Tristan da Cunha
Treaties extended to Montserrat
Treaties extended to Norfolk Island
Treaties extended to Guernsey
Treaties extended to Jersey
Treaties extended to the Isle of Man
Treaties extended to the Faroe Islands
Treaties extended to the Nauru Trust Territory
Treaties extended to the Territory of Papua and New Guinea
Treaties extended to Surinam (Dutch colony)
Treaties extended to the British Solomon Islands
Treaties extended to British Cyprus
Treaties extended to British Dominica
Treaties extended to the Colony of Fiji
Treaties extended to the Gambia Colony and Protectorate
Treaties extended to the Gilbert and Ellice Islands
Treaties extended to British Kenya
Treaties extended to British Mauritius
Treaties extended to the Crown Colony of Seychelles
Treaties extended to British Somaliland
Treaties extended to the Sultanate of Zanzibar
Treaties extended to British Honduras
Treaties extended to the Federation of Rhodesia and Nyasaland
Treaties extended to Basutoland
Treaties extended to the Bechuanaland Protectorate
Treaties extended to Swaziland (protectorate)
Treaties extended to the British Windward Islands
Treaties extended to the British Leeward Islands
Treaties extended to the Colony of Jamaica
Treaties extended to the Colony of the Bahamas
Treaties extended to Portuguese Macau
Treaties extended to French Algeria
Treaties extended to Clipperton Island
Treaties extended to French Comoros
Treaties extended to French Somaliland
Treaties extended to the French Southern and Antarctic Lands
Treaties extended to French Guiana
Treaties extended to French Polynesia
Treaties extended to Guadeloupe
Treaties extended to Martinique
Treaties extended to Mayotte
Treaties extended to New Caledonia
Treaties extended to Réunion
Treaties extended to Saint Pierre and Miquelon
Treaties extended to Wallis and Futuna
Treaties extended to Southern Rhodesia
Treaties extended to West Berlin
Right of asylum